Vetluzhsky (masculine), Vetluzhskaya (feminine), or Vetluzhskoye (neuter) is the name of several urban localities in  Russia:
Vetluzhsky, Kostroma Oblast, an urban-type settlement under the administrative jurisdiction of the town of oblast significance of Sharya, Kostroma Oblast
Vetluzhsky, Nizhny Novgorod Oblast, a work settlement in Krasnobakovsky District of Nizhny Novgorod Oblast